Choco-Story is a chain of chocolate museums

 Choco-Story New York
 Choco-Story Brugge
 Choco-Story Brussels